"Carioca" is a song by Italian singer and pianist Raphael Gualazzi. The song was released as a digital download and for streaming on 5 February 2020 by Sugar Music as the lead single from his fifth studio album Ho un piano. The song peaked at number thirty-three on the Italian Singles Chart. The song was Gualazzi's entry for the Sanremo Music Festival 2020, the 70th edition of Italy's musical festival which doubles also as a selection of the act for Eurovision Song Contest, where it placed 11th in the grand final. The song was written by Raphael Gualazzi, Davide Pavanello and Davide Petrella.

Music video
A music video for "Carioca" was released on YouTube on 5 February 2020.

Track listing

Charts

Release history

References

2020 singles
2020 songs
Songs written by Raphael Gualazzi
Sugar Music singles
Songs written by Davide Petrella